Ricky Jade-Jones (born 8 November 2002) is an English footballer who plays as a striker or midfielder for League One club Peterborough United.

Career
Jones came from the Peterborough United academy. He made his first-team debut, aged 16, against Arsenal U21s in an EFL Trophy match in October 2019, signing his first professional contract on his 17th birthday. Manager Darren Ferguson stated that Jones "must be the quickest player I've ever managed and I've managed some quick ones. He's a talent, there's no doubt about that."  In his second appearance and first start he scored his first goal for the club in an EFL Trophy tie against Cambridge United on 12 November 2019. The striker went on to score his second goal in as many games, scoring against Stevenage in an FA Cup replay on 19 November 2019. He went on to make his league debut on 23 November 2019 against Burton Albion.

Career statistics

References

2002 births
Living people
People from Peterborough
English footballers
Association football midfielders
Association football forwards
Peterborough United F.C. players
English Football League players
Black British sportspeople